Young Rebel Set were an English Indie Rock band from the North East of England. They formed in Stockton-on-Tees in 2007.

The band consisted of Matthew Chipchase (vocals and acoustic guitar), Mark William Evans (guitar, mandolin), Andrew Parmley (electric guitar), Chris Parmley (Bass) and Luke Evans (Drums and Backing Vocals). They have been classed as "life affirming graft rock" by the NME. They take inspiration from the likes of Bruce Springsteen, Johnny Cash, Dire Straits and The Pogues.

History

Formation and early years (2007–09)
The band met after an impromptu gig at Stockton KuBar and Young Rebel Set came to fruition in the winter of the same year. They signed to Ignition Records, home of music heavyweights Oasis on 11 February 2011 following several self-released singles. They toured the UK in 2008 and 2009, including slots supporting The Coral, The Pigeon Detectives, Cage The Elephant and The Courteeners.

Curse Our Love (2009–11)
In August 2009 they were championed by the NME as "the perfect antidote to cold careerist indie" in a two-page spread in the magazine's RADAR feature, shortly before the release of their debut single "If I Was". The second single "Walk On" followed in November. It received support on BBC Radio 1 via DJs Annie Mac and Huw Stephens. The band toured the UK, Germany, Switzerland, Austria, Belgium and the Netherlands in February and March 2010.

Their fourth release was the Won’t Get Up Again EP which was released in May 2010. "Measure of a Man" followed in October 2010 and featured This is England'''s Jo Hartly in the accompanying music video. Their debut album Curse Our Love was released by Ignition Records in the UK in April 2011 and by Independent record label Grand Hotel van Cleef in Germany in May 2011.

In May 2011 the band recorded an interview session with Dermot O'Leary for BBC Radio 2, followed by airplay of their single "Lion's Mouth" which succeeded the album release. During this time the band also recorded a live Maida Vale session for Steve Lamacq's 6music show. "Red Bricks", the final single taken from the album, was released in August 2011.

Crocodile (2013–14)Crocodile, the band's second album, was recorded in Glasgow at Chem19 Studios with producer (and former Delgado's drummer) Paul Savage, best known for his work with Mogwai, The Phantom Band and Arab Strap, in early 2013. They spent most of the autumn/winter promoting the album in Germany, where it was released by Grand Hotel Van Cleef. They played a homecoming gig to more than 600 fans in The Crypt at Middlesbrough Town Hall in December 2013, and, in December 2014, they returned to the Town Hall again to play to a sell out crowd, this time  in the main room.

The first single taken from the album was "The Lash Of The Whip". Filmed in Germany, the video for the single was a take on the classic 90's british film 'Trainspotting' with the band members acting out the roles of the differing characters. The second single to be taken from the album was "Tuned Transmission", and was be released in March 2014.

In November 2013 the band announced they will tour the UK in February 2014 and headline the Stockton Calling Festival on 30 March 2014.

In 2015 the band announced via their Facebook page that they were taking a permanent hiatus.

Death of Matt Chipchase (December 2019)
On 2 December 2019 the band announced the death of frontman Matt Chipchase on their Facebook page 

Discography

Studio albumsCurse Our Love (2011)Crocodile (2013)

Extended playsWon't Get Up Again'' (May 2010)

Singles
"If I Was" (2009)
"Walk On" (2009)
"Measure of a Man" (2010)
"Lion's Mouth" (2011)
"Red Bricks" (2011)
"The Lash of the Whip" (2013)
"Tuned Transmission" (2014)

References

External links 

 

English indie rock groups
Musical groups established in 2007
Grand Hotel van Cleef Records artists
Ignition Records artists